A Rakshasa is a mythological being in Hinduism and Buddhism. 

Rakshasa may also refer to:

Rakshasa (Dungeons & Dragons), creatures in the role-playing game Dungeons & Dragons
Rakshasa (fiction), the use of Rakshasas in fiction
Rakshasa (amatya), character in the ancient Indian drama Mudrarakshasa by Vishakhadatta, amatya (minister) of the Nanda Empire
Rakshasa (film), a 2005 Indian Kannada-language film 
Rakshasa Kingdom, Hindu mythological kingdom
Rakshasa Rajavu, a 2001 Indian Malayalam-language film

See also
Brahmarakshasa
Raksha (disambiguation)